The 1962 Hofstra Flying Dutchmen football team represented Hofstra College during the 1962 NCAA College Division football season. Hofstra finished with an overall record of 8–2 in its 22nd season of varsity play. After a successful regular season in which Hofstra went 8–1 (1–0 in conference play) and outscored its opponents 175 to 83, the Flying Dutchmen were invited to their first (and program's only) bowl game – the Cement Bowl, played in Allentown, Pennsylvania. Their head coach was Howdy Myers and their captains were Dick Caproni and Ron Zoia.

Schedule

References

Hofstra
Hofstra Pride football seasons
Hofstra Flying Dutchmen football